Joseph Trumah Bayel (born 20 June 1954) is a Ghanaian politician and a member of the 3rd parliament of the 4th Republic of Ghana and a former member of parliament for Sawla/Kalba district of the Northern Region of Ghana.

Early life and education 
Bayel was born on 20 June 1954. He attended St John Bosco's Training College.

Career 
Bayel is a teacher by profession. He is also a Ghanaian politician.

Politics 
He is a member of the 1st, 2nd and 3rd parliament of the 4th republic of Ghana. His first appearance in parliament was in 1992 when he contested as a parliamentary candidate for the Sawla/Kalba constituency on the ticket of the National Democratic Congress. Even though, information about his 1992 victory is not scarce to get, he was again reelected into parliament in the 1996 election which he won with a total of 17,876 valid vote cast making 59.40%. He contested again in the 2000 Ghanaian general election and maintained the seat for the National Democratic Congress for the third term. He won with 10,286 votes making 57.50% of the total valid vote cast. His political with the National Democratic Congress ended but he resurfaced in 2012 on the ticket.

Personal life 
Bayel is a Christian. He is a teacher by profession. He graduated from St. John Bosco's College of Education.

References 

Living people
Ghanaian MPs 2001–2005
21st-century Ghanaian politicians
Ghanaian educators
National Democratic Congress (Ghana) politicians
1954 births
Ghanaian MPs 1997–2001
People from Northern Region (Ghana)